Niebla, a Spanish word (from Latin nebula, also meaning) "mist, fog", may refer to :

Places and jurisdiction 
 Niebla, Spain, a town, former bishopric and titular see in Andalusia, southern Spain
 Taifa of Niebla, a medieval Moorish 'taifa' kingdom on the Iberian peninsula
 Niebla, Chile, a coastal town in the municipality of Valdivia

People 
 Mr. Niebla (1973–2019), Mexican masked wrestler
 Eduardo Niebla (born 1955), Spanish guitarist
 Ruben Niebla (born 1971), baseball player from California

Other 
 Niebla (dinosaur), a genus
 Niebla (lichen), a genus
 Niebla (novel), a novel by Miguel de Unamuno, published 1914
 Niebla (telenovela), Mexican telenovela